The Hindi language employs a large number of profanities across the Hindi-speaking diaspora. Idiomatic expressions, particularly profanity, are not always directly translatable into other languages, and make little sense even when they can be translated. Many English translations may not offer the full meaning of the profanity used in the context.

Hindi profanities often contain references to incest and notions of honor. Hindi profanities may have origins in Persian, Urdu, or Sanskrit. Hindi profanity is used such as promoting racism, sexism or offending someone. Hindi slurs are extensively used in social medias in Hinglish, although use of Devanagari script for throwing slurs is on rise.

Public reception 
Although Hindi profanities are often used colloquially, few censorship attempts have been made. The Indian Central Board of Film Certification (CBFC) chairman Pahlaj Nihalani reportedly sent the Producers' Association and Regional Officers a list of censored words that could not be used in films. This has sparked a lot of controversy.

Examples 
Madarchod (मादरचोद; English: Motherfucker), sometimes abbreviated as MC, is a Hindi-language vulgarism. It is a form of the profanity fuck. While the word is usually considered highly offensive, it is rarely used in the literal sense of one who engages in sexual activity with another person's mother, or their own mother.
 Bhenchod (बहनचोद; English: Sisterfucker), also pronounced as behanchod is sometimes abbreviated as BC, is a Hindi-language vulgarism. It is a form of the profanity fuck. The word is considered highly offensive, and is rarely used in literal sense of one who engages in sexual activity with another person's sister, or their own sister.

References 

Profanity by language